Inge Krokann (19 August 1893   – 27 September 1962) was a Norwegian writer. His most famous work is  I Dovre Sno  (1929), an epic story of the Loe family during the Middle Ages. Because his writing was full of local expressions and is so strongly tied to the use of the Oppdal dialect and idiosyncratic Nynorsk,   his works are largely inaccessible and difficult to translate.

Biography
Ingebrikt Krokann was born at Oppdal  in Trøndelag, Norway. He was the son of Trond Jonsson Krokann (1858-1936) and Dørdi Olsdatter Lo (1859-1933). In 1915 he took his final  exam at Volda lærarskule.  He worked as a teacher  first at the children's school in Rennebu. During the winter of 1917–18,  he got a leave to go to Askov Folk High School in Denmark, and then he took a college course in Volda. From 1920 to 1923 he taught at Skogn Folkhøgskule. He developed tuberculosis and never fully recovered. He taught at the Nordic folk college in Fredriksberg in Denmark during 1937–1938. Krokann received several travel grants and traveled to many countries in Europe and Africa.

He was married in 1921 with Gunvor Widebæk Lund (1899-1991). He died at Gausdal in Oppland, Norway.

His work was characterized by:
 Vivid descriptions of the relationships between man and nature in the harsh environment around his birthplace of Oppdal;
 Effective and innovative use of the  Oppdal dialect  and nynorsk in his writing;
 A strong sense of history in his writing, tying together the pagan and Christian eras in Norwegian history.

Bibliography
 I Dovre-sno, Gyldendal, 1929.
 Gjenom fonna, 2 volumes, Gyldendal, 1931.
 Olav Aukrust,  1933.
 På linfeksing, Gyldendal, 1934.
 Blodrøter, Gyldendal, 1936.
 Då bøndene reiste seg, Gyldendal, 1937.
 Det store hamskiftet i bondesamfunnet, Samlaget, 1942.
 Under himmelteiknet, Gyldendal, 1944.
 Dikt, Gyldendal, 1947.
 Ut av skuggen, Gyldendal, 1949.
 Gravlagt av lynet, Gyldendal, 1952.
 Oppdal, bygda mi, 1952.

Awards
 Gyldendal's Endowment for 1942
 Melsom-prisen 1942 (together with Ragnvald Vaage)
 Dobloug Prize 1954

References

1893 births
1962 deaths
People from Oppdal
People from Gausdal
Norwegian educators
Nynorsk-language writers
20th-century Norwegian novelists
Norwegian people with disabilities
XU
Dobloug Prize winners
20th-century Norwegian writers
Norwegian writers